Ricardo Batista (born: 30 December 1969) is a sailor from Lisbon, Portugal. who represented his country at the 1992 Summer Olympics in Barcelona, Spain as crew member in the Soling. With helmsman Antonio Tanger and fellow crew member Luis Miguel Santos they took the 21st place.

References

Living people
1969 births
Sailors at the 1992 Summer Olympics – Soling
Olympic sailors of Portugal
Portuguese male sailors (sport)
Sportspeople from Lisbon